Aznayevo (Aźnay) is a rural locality (a village) in Itkulovsky Selsoviet, Ishimbaysky District, Bashkortostan, Russia. The population was 278 as of 2010. There are 4 streets.

Geography 
Aznayevo is located 29 km southeast of Ishimbay (the district's administrative centre) by road. Khazinovo is the nearest rural locality.

References 

Rural localities in Ishimbaysky District